Chandeliers in the Savannah is  Neon Blonde's debut album, released September 13, 2005.

Track listing 

 "Black Cactus Killers" - 2:34
 "Crystal Beaches Never Turned Me On" - 2:51
 "Chandeliers and Vines" - 4:07
 "Princess Skullface Sings" - 2:30
 "New Detroit" - 2:50
 "Headlines" - 3:23
 "Love Hounds" - 3:27
 "Dead Mellotron" - 2:37
 "Cherries in Slow Motion" - 4:02
 "The Future is a Mesh Stallion" - 3:47
 "Wings Made out of Noise" - 2:21

Notes

The music video for "Headlines" features marionette versions of the band performing the song.

Aside from performing the vocals for the band, Johnny Whitney plays the guitar, bass, keyboard, and piano as well as drum programming.

References

2005 debut albums